The seventy-sixth Minnesota Legislature first convened on January 3, 1989. The 67 members of the Minnesota Senate were elected during the General Election of November 4, 1986, and the 134 members of the Minnesota House of Representatives were elected during the General Election of November 8, 1988.

Sessions 
The legislature met in a regular session from January 3, 1989, to May 22, 1989. A special session was convened from September 27, 1989, to September 29, 1989, to pass a tax bill to replace the one which was vetoed by Governor Rudy Perpich, as well as to consider property tax relief and the statewide solid waste recycling program.

A continuation of the regular session was held between February 12, 1990, and April 25, 1990.

Party summary 
Resignations and new members are discussed in the "Membership changes" section, below.

Senate

House of Representatives

Leadership

Senate 
President of the Senate
Jerome M. Hughes (DFL-Maplewood)

Senate Majority Leader
Roger Moe (DFL-Erskine)

Senate Minority Leader
Duane Benson (IR-Lanesboro)

House of Representatives 
Speaker of the House
Robert Vanasek (DFL-New Prague)

House Majority Leader
Until June 21, 1989 Ann Wynia (DFL-St. Paul)
After June 21, 1989 Dee Long (DFL-Minneapolis)

House Minority Leader
Bill Schreiber (IR-Brooklyn Park)

Members

Senate

House of Representatives

Membership changes

Senate

House of Representatives

References 

 Minnesota Legislators Past & Present - Session Search Results (Session 76, Senate)
 Minnesota Legislators Past & Present - Session Search Results (Session 76, House)

76th
1980s in Minnesota
1990s in Minnesota
1989 in Minnesota
1990 in Minnesota
1989 U.S. legislative sessions
1990 U.S. legislative sessions